Calyptrogyne is a genus in the palm family (Arecaceae). The distribution of this genus is  Central America, Colombia, and southern Mexico, with 11 of the 17 known species endemic to Panama. Calyptrogyne ghiesbreghtiana is the most widespread and best studied species in this genus.

 Calyptrogyne allenii (L.H.Bailey) de Nevers - Panama
 Calyptrogyne anomala de Nevers & A.J.Hend. - Panama
 Calyptrogyne baudensis A.J.Hend. - Colombia
 Calyptrogyne coloradensis A.J.Hend. - Panama
 Calyptrogyne condensata (L.H.Bailey) Wess.Boer - Panama, Costa Rica
 Calyptrogyne costatifrons (L.H.Bailey) de Nevers - Panama
 Calyptrogyne deneversii A.J.Hend. - Panama
 Calyptrogyne fortunensis A.J.Hend. - Panama
 Calyptrogyne ghiesbreghtiana (Linden & H.Wendl.) H.Wendl. - Chiapas, Tabasco, Veracruz, Belize, Guatemala, Honduras, Nicaragua, Costa Rica, Panama
 Calyptrogyne herrerae Grayum. - Costa Rica
 Calyptrogyne kunorum de Nevers - Panama
 Calyptrogyne osensis A.J.Hend. - Costa Rica
 Calyptrogyne panamensis A.J.Hend. - Panama
 Calyptrogyne pubescens de Nevers - Panama
 Calyptrogyne sanblasensis A.J.Hend. - Panama
 Calyptrogyne trichostachys Burret - Costa Rica
 Calyptrogyne tutensis A.J.Hend. - Panama

References

 
Trees of Central America
Arecaceae genera